Renee Leota (born 16 May 1990 in Wellington), is a female association football player who represents New Zealand at international level.

Career
Leota made her senior international debut as a substitute in a 0–3 loss to China PR on 14 November 2006.

She was included in the New Zealand squad for the 2008 Summer Olympics, appearing as a substitute in both the 2–2 draw with Japan and the 0–1 loss to Norway.

Leota, who had made a single substitute appearance at the 2006 Women's U-20 World Cup finals in Russia as they held Brazil to a goalless draw, was again included in the U-20 squad for the 2008 Women's U-20 World Cup finals in Chile. She appeared in the first group game as a second-half substitute as New Zealand lost 2–3 against African champions, Nigeria, and scored with her first touch of the ball in their second group game as she came on as a 65th-minute substitute, helping NZ to a 4–3 win over the hosts. In 2010, she represented New Zealand for a third Under-20 World Cup, this time in Germany, playing in all three group games.

References

External links
 
 NZ Football – Renee Leota player profile

1990 births
Living people
New Zealand women's international footballers
New Zealand women's association footballers
Olympic association footballers of New Zealand
Footballers at the 2008 Summer Olympics
Association footballers from Wellington City
Women's association football forwards
Waterside Karori players